Mark Strauss may refer to:

Mark Strauss (journalist) (born 1966), senior editor at Smithsonian Magazine
Mark L. Strauss, New Testament Biblical scholar